Cristina Fink (born Cristina Fink Smith; December 12, 1964) is a psychologist and retired high jumper from Mexico, who set her personal best on May 17, 1992, jumping 1.94 meters at a meet in Mexico City. She competed for her country at the 1988 Summer Olympics in Seoul, South Korea, where she finished in 20th place (1.84 meters). Her son, Pablo Sisniega, is a goalkeeper for Los Angeles FC.

International competitions

References

External links
 
 
 Women's World All-Time List: Christina Fink-Sisniega

1964 births
Living people
Mexican female high jumpers
Olympic athletes of Mexico
Athletes (track and field) at the 1988 Summer Olympics
Athletes (track and field) at the 1992 Summer Olympics
Athletes (track and field) at the 1987 Pan American Games
Athletes (track and field) at the 1991 Pan American Games
Pan American Games competitors for Mexico
Mexican people of Irish descent
Central American and Caribbean Games silver medalists for Mexico
Central American and Caribbean Games bronze medalists for Mexico
Competitors at the 1986 Central American and Caribbean Games
Competitors at the 1990 Central American and Caribbean Games
Central American and Caribbean Games medalists in athletics
Competitors at the 1989 Summer Universiade
21st-century Mexican women
20th-century Mexican women